Adrian Szőke (born 1 July 1998) is a professional footballer who plays as a midfielder for Serbian club Bačka Topola on loan from the Hungarian side Diósgyőr.

Club career
Szőke signed a two-year contract with an option for an additional season with Eredivisie club Heracles Almelo on 7 July 2019. 

On 22 June 2022, Szőke moved to Nemzeti Bajnokság II club Diósgyőr as a free agent.

International career
Born in Serbia, he is ethnically Hungarian and has most recently represented Hungary at youth level.

References

External links
 Adrian Szőke at Heracles.nl 
 

1998 births
People from Senta
Hungarians in Vojvodina
Living people
Hungarian footballers
Hungary under-21 international footballers
Serbian footballers
Serbia youth international footballers
Association football midfielders
Regionalliga players
Eredivisie players
Serbian SuperLiga players
Nemzeti Bajnokság II players
1. FC Köln II players
Heracles Almelo players
Diósgyőri VTK players
FK TSC Bačka Topola players
Hungarian expatriate footballers
Serbian expatriate footballers
Expatriate footballers in Germany
Hungarian expatriate sportspeople in Germany
Serbian expatriate sportspeople in Germany
Expatriate footballers in the Netherlands
Hungarian expatriate sportspeople in the Netherlands
Serbian expatriate sportspeople in the Netherlands